The 1918 United States Senate election in South Dakota took place on November 5, 1918. Incumbent Republican Senator Thomas Sterling sought re-election in his first popular election. He defeated former Governor Frank M. Byrne in the Republican primary and then faced former State Representative Orville Rinehart, the 1916 Democratic nominee for Governor, in the general election. Sterling defeated Rinehart, along with independent candidate W. T. Rafferty, by a wide margin to win re-election.

Democratic Primary

Candidates
 Orville V. Rinehart, former State Representative from Pennington County, 1916 Democratic nominee for Governor
 James Coffey, Internal Revenue Collector for North and South Dakota
 John E. Kelley, former U.S. Congressman from South Dakota's at-large congressional district

Results

Republican Primary

Candidates
 Thomas Sterling, incumbent U.S. Senator
 Frank M. Byrne, former Governor of South Dakota

Results

Socialist Primary

Candidates
 John C. Knapp

Results

After winning the primary, Knapp withdrew as a candidate, citing his disagreement with the Socialist Party's anti-war policies.

General election

Results

References

South Dakota
1918
1918 South Dakota elections